Wang Chenghan (December 1917 – 20 November 2009) was a general in the People's Liberation Army of China who served as political commissar of the PLA Academy of Military Sciences from 1985 to 1990.

He was a delegate to the 5th National People's Congress. He was a member of the 12th Central Committee of the Chinese Communist Party and a member of the 13th Central Advisory Commission of the Chinese Communist Party.

Biography
Wang was born in Hong'an County, Hubei, in December 1917. He enlisted in the Red Army in December 1930, and joined the Chinese Communist Party (CCP) in 1933. At the age of 17, he served as a company commander of the 25th Red Army. Together with Xu Haidong and Cheng Zihua, he broke through the tight encirclement and entered northern Shaanxi. At the age of 19, he was promoted to head of the 262nd Regiment of the 30th Red Army.

During the Chinese Civil War, he participated in a series of battles, such as the Campaign of the North China Plain Pocket, Menglianggu campaign, Linfen Campaign, Taiyuan campaign, Xi'an campaign, Xianyang campaign, and South China campaign.

After establishment of the Communist State, in 1951, he took part in the Korean War led by Peng Dehuai. In 1955 he was awarded the military rank of major general (shaojiang) by Chairman Mao Zedong. In 1957, he became first deputy commander and chief of staff of the 60th Army, rising to commander in 1960. He was deputy commander of the Tibet Military District in 1964, and held that office until December 1968. He served as deputy commander of the Chengdu Military Region in March 1969, and thirteen years later promoted to the commander position. In December 1982 he was admitted to member of the Standing Committee of the CCP Sichuan Provincial Committee, the province's top authority. In November 1985, he was appointed political commissar of the PLA Academy of Military Sciences, serving in the post until his retirement in April 1990. He was promoted to the rank of general (shangjiang) in 1988. 

On 20 November 2009, he died of an illness in Beijing, at the age of 92.

Autobiography

References

1917 births
2009 deaths
People from Hong'an County
Counter-Japanese Military and Political University alumni
People's Liberation Army generals from Hubei
People's Republic of China politicians from Hubei
Chinese Communist Party politicians from Hubei
Delegates to the 5th National People's Congress
Members of the 12th Central Committee of the Chinese Communist Party
Commanders of the Chengdu Military Region